The Granville Bridge is a road bridge over the Mary River at Maryborough, Queensland, Australia.

The bridge, opened to traffic in 1926, was a second bridge in Maryborough. It was named after a suburb of Granville located on the eastern bank of the Mary River. It is the only river crossing providing access between the town centre and Granville, and other places such as Poona, Maaroom and Boonooroo.

The bridge is a low level bridge designed for inundation, which was thought to be less likely to be damaged by floating debris during floods. Due to its construction it is often prone to flooding. Most recently during the January 2010 floods the bridge was covered by floodwaters for five days.

Since the 1992 floods, when Granville was cut off twice, local residents have been petitioning Council to build a new high level bridge.

References

Road bridges in Queensland
Bridges completed in 1926
Buildings and structures in Maryborough, Queensland
Concrete bridges in Australia
Mary River (Queensland)
1926 establishments in Australia